Doctor Pedro P. Peña was a village in the Boquerón department of Paraguay. It used to be the capital of Boquerón until 1992, when Filadelfia became capital.

At around 2006, the Pilcomayo River changed its path and destroyed most of Dr. Pedro P. Peña. After the incident the village was abandoned. The mission P. P. Peña moved approx. 8 km north.

References

Sources 
World Gazeteer: Paraguay – World-Gazetteer.com

Populated places in the Boquerón Department